Kreekhuizen is a neighborhood of Rotterdam, Netherlands.

References 

Neighbourhoods of Rotterdam